The 2003 Puerto Armuelles earthquake occurred on December 25 at 02:11 local time (07:11 UTC). The epicenter was located in Panama, at about 7 km east of Puerto Armuelles, near the Panama-Costa Rica border. The earthquake had a magnitude of  6.5. Two people were reported dead in Puerto Armuelles. There was building damage in Panama and Costa Rica. Power outage lasted for about four hours in Puerto Armuelles. The maximal intensity was MM VIII in Finca Naranjo, Costa Rica. The intensity was MM VII in Armuelles, Panama, and MM IV in Limón and the Central Valley, Costa Rica, including San José. This earthquake could also be felt in Panama City.

See also 
List of earthquakes in 2003
List of earthquakes in Costa Rica
List of earthquakes in Panama

References

External links 
M 6.5 - Panama-Costa Rica border region – United States Geological Survey

2003 earthquakes
2003 in Costa Rica
2003 in Panama
Earthquakes in Costa Rica
Earthquakes in Panama